The Voice TV was a Norwegian-language television channel operated by ProSiebenSat.1 Media AG that mostly broadcast music. It was launched in 2004, its sister channels in Sweden, Finland and Denmark launching the same year.

In 2005, the channel increased its penetration since it became part of the basic package of cable television distributor Canal Digital.

In the Norwegian market The Voice was also used as a brand for a radio network, see The Voice Hiphop & RnB Norway.

The station closed in 2012.

Music television channels
Defunct television channels in Norway
Television channels and stations established in 2004
Television channels and stations disestablished in 2012
Music organisations based in Norway

de:The Voice TV